HD 158220 is a giant Be star in the southern constellation of Ara. This is a pulsating variable star that changes brightness by an amplitude of 0.030 magnitude over a period of 1.15 days.

References

External links
 HR 6505
 Image HD 158220

Ara (constellation)
Be stars
158220
085751
6505
Arae, V862
B-type bright giants
Durchmusterung objects